Baptiste Lake is a lake in Alberta, Canada.

The lake has the name of Baptiste Majeau, a pioneer citizen.

Summer villages
The following summer villages are located along Baptiste Lake:
South Baptiste
Sunset Beach
West Baptiste
Whispering Hills

See also
List of lakes in Alberta

References

Athabasca County
Lakes of Alberta